James Nightingale (born 1881) was a Scottish professional footballer who played as a back.

Career
Born in Edinburgh, Nightingale spent his early career with Bolton St Luke's, Bolton Wanderers, Rochdale Town, Southport Central and Rossendale United. He joined Bradford City November 1905, making 10 league appearances, before being released in 1906.

Sources

References

1881 births
Year of death missing
Scottish footballers
Bolton Wanderers F.C. players
Rochdale Town F.C. players
Southport F.C. players
Rossendale United F.C. players
Bradford City A.F.C. players
English Football League players
Association football defenders